Pseudoxycheila is a genus of beetles in the family Cicindelidae, containing the following species:

 Pseudoxycheila andina Cassola, 1997
 Pseudoxycheila angustata Chaudoir, 1865  
 Pseudoxycheila atahualpa Cassola, 1997 
 Pseudoxycheila aymara Cassola, 1997 
 Pseudoxycheila bipustulata (Latreille, 1811)
 Pseudoxycheila caribe Cassola, 1997  
 Pseudoxycheila ceratoma Chaudoir, 1865 
 Pseudoxycheila chaudoiri Dokhtouroff, 1882
 Pseudoxycheila colombiana Cassola, 1997 
 Pseudoxycheila confusa Cassola, 1997 
 Pseudoxycheila immaculata W. Horn, 1905
 Pseudoxycheila inca Cassola, 1997 
 Pseudoxycheila lateguttata Chaudoir, 1844 
 Pseudoxycheila macrocephala Cassola, 1997
 Pseudoxycheila nitidicollis Cassola, 1997
 Pseudoxycheila onorei Cassola, 1997 
 Pseudoxycheila oxychiloides W. Horn, 1927 
 Pseudoxycheila pearsoni Cassola, 1997 
 Pseudoxycheila pseudotarsalis Cassola, 1997 
 Pseudoxycheila quechua Cassola, 1997  
 Pseudoxycheila tarsalis Bates, 1869 
 Pseudoxycheila tucumana Perger & Guerra, 2012

References

Cicindelidae